The 1941 German Ice Hockey Championship was the 25th season of the German Ice Hockey Championship, the national championship of Germany. SC Riessersee won the championship by defeating LTTC Rot-Weiß Berlin in the final.

First round

Group A

Group B

Group C

Group D

Semifinals

Final

References

External links
German ice hockey standings 1933-1945

Ger
German Ice Hockey Championship seasons
Champion